This is a list of the various rulers of Auvergne.

History
In the 7th century Auvergne was disputed between the Franks and Aquitanians. It was later conquered by the Carolingians, and was integrated for a time into the kingdom of Aquitaine. The counts of Auvergne slowly became autonomous.

In the 10th century Auvergne became a disputed territory between the count of Poitiers and the counts of Toulouse.

In the Middle Ages Auvergne was broken into four feudal domains:

 the county of Auvergne (created around 980)
 the bishopric of Clermont or ecclesiastical county of Clermont (created around 980 as a sort of counter-power)
 the dauphinate of Auvergne or the worldly county of Clermont (formed around 1155 after a coup but not formally created until 1302)
 the duchy of Auvergne or the land of Auvergne (formed from the royal domain of Auvergne in 1360)

Auvergne was integrated in turn into the appanages of Alphonse, count of Poitou and Toulouse (1241–1271) and of John, duke of Berry and Auvergne and count of Poitiers and Montpensier (1360–1416).

During the Hundred Years' War Auvergne faced numerous raids and revolts, including the Tuchin Revolt.

In 1424 the Duchy of Auvergne passed to the House of Bourbon.

Quite contemporaneously, the County of Auvergne passed to the House of La Tour d'Auvergne, and upon its extinction in 1531 it passed to Catherine de' Medici before becoming a royal domain.

In 1434, the Dauphinate of Auvergne passed to the House of Bourbon-Montpensier.

Counts of Auvergne

List of Burgundian Dukes
Victorius (479–488)
Apollonarus (506)
Hortensius of Neustria (527)
Becco (532)
Sigivald (533)
Hortensius (534)
Evodius ?
Georgius ?
Britianus ?
Firminus (c. 555 or 558, deposed)
Sallustus (duke c. 555 or 558–560)
Firminus (restored, 560–571)
Venerandus (before 585)
Nicetius I (duke and count c. 585)
Nicetius II (c. 585)
Eulalius (duke 585–590)

List of counts of the Frankish era
part of Austrasia (592–595)
part of Burgundy (595–613)
part of Austrasia (612–639)
Bobon of Neustria (639–656)
Hector of Neustria (c. 655–675)
Bodilon of Austrasia (c. 675)
Calminius of Neustria (c. 670s)
Genesius (c. 680s)
Haribert of Neustria (c. 690s)
part of Neustria until 751

List of Carolingian and French counts
Ithier (c. 758)
Blandin (760–763)
Chilping (763–765)
Bertmond (765–778)
Icterius (778–?)
Guerin (819–839)
Gerard (839–841)
William I (841–846)
Bernard I (846–858)
William II (858–862)
Stephen (862–863)
Bernard Plantapilosa (864–886), married Ermengard, daughter of Bernard I
William I of Aquitaine (886–918), son of Bernard Plantapilosa
William II of Aquitaine (restored, 918–926), son of Adelinda, daughter of Bernard Plantapilosa
Acfred of Aquitaine (926–927), son of Adelinda, daughter Bernard Plantapilosa

After the death of Acfred, who left the comital fisc completely diminished, there appeared no successor who could control the entire Auvergne, with Velay. Several relatives of surrounding regions made claims. Below are the dates of their effective control.

Ebalus Manzer (927–934), great-grandson of Gerard
Raymond Pons, Count of Toulouse (940–941)
William III, Duke of Aquitaine (950–963), son of Ebalus Manzer
Armand of Clermont (?–?)
Robert I of Clermont (?–?)
Robert II of Clermont (?–?)
Robert III of Clermont (?–?), son of Robert II
Guy I of Auvergne (979–989), son of Robert II
William IV of Auvergne (989–1016)
Robert I of Auvergne (1016–1032)
William V of Auvergne (1032–1064), son of Robert I
Robert II of Auvergne (1064–1096), son of William V
William VI of Auvergne (1096–1136)
Robert III of Auvergne (1136–1143), son of William VI
William VII the Young of Auvergne (1143 – c. 1155)
William VIII the Old, count of Auvergne (1155–1182); overthrew his nephew, William VII, in 1155 and took over most of the county (see below)
Robert IV (1182–1194)
William IX of Auvergne (1194–1195); not always listed as a count
Guy II of Auvergne (1195–1224); Philip II of France confiscated much of Auvergne in 1209, leading to the later creation of the duchy of Auvergne (see below)
William X of Auvergne (1224–1246)
Robert V, count of Auvergne (1246–1277) (from here onwards the counts are usually also counts of Boulogne)
William XI of Auvergne (fr) (1277–1279)
Robert VI, count of Auvergne (1279–1317)
Robert VII, count of Auvergne (1317–1325)
William XII of Auvergne (1325–1332), son of Robert VII
Joan I, Countess of Auvergne (1332–1360), daughter of William XII
Philip of Burgundy (1338–1346), first husband of Joan I
John II of France (1350–1360), second husband of Joan I
Philip I, duke of Burgundy (1360–1361), son of Joan I and Philip
John I (1361–1386), son of Robert VII
John II (1386–1394), son of John I
Joan II, Countess of Auvergne (1394–1422), daughter of John II
John, Duke of Berry (1394–1416), first husband of Joan II
Georges de la Tremoille (1416–1422), second husband of Joan II
Marie I, Countess of Auvergne (1422–1437), cousin of Joan II; daughter of Godfroy of Auvergne
Bertrand V of La Tour (1437–1461), son of Marie I
Bertrand VI of La Tour (1461–1494), son of Bertrand V
John III (1494–1501), son of Bertrand VI
Anne de La Tour d'Auvergne (1501–1524), daughter of John III
Catherine de' Medici (1524–1589), niece of Anne
Charles III, Duke of Lorraine (1589–1608), son-in-law of Catherine (although her granddaughter Isabella Clara Eugenia would have been genealogically senior)
Margaret of Valois (1608–1610), daughter of Catherine; wife of King Henry IV of France. The marriage produced no children and was annulled. Henry then married Margaret's cousin, Marie de' Medici

Appanage
 Charles de Valois (1589–1650), illegitimate son of Charles IX of France and duke of Angoulême
 Louis-Emmanuel d'Angoulême (1650–1653), his son

 Became part of the royal domain upon the ascension of Louis XIII of France, son of Henry IV and Marie de'Medici

Bishops of Clermont
The title of bishop of Clermont is used from 1160 onwards. Before then they were called bishop of Arvernes. In 2002, the Bishopric of Clermont was incorporated into the Archbishopric of Clermont-Ferrand.

List of bishops of Arvernes
 Saint Austromoine (3rd or 4th century)
 Urbicus
 Legonius
 Saint Illidius (also called Allyre or Alyre) († 384)
 Nepotianus
 Artemius
 Venerand
 Rusticus
 Namatius (also called Namacius or Namace)
 Eparchius
 Saint Apollinarius I (471–486)
 Abrunculus
 Euphrasius († 515)
 Apollinarius II
 Saint Quintien (about 523)
 Gallus of Clermont (Gallus I) (about 486/525-551)
 Cautin (about 554–572)
 Saint Avitus (Avitus I) (572–594)
 Caesarius (627)
 Saint Gallus (Gallus II) (about 650)
 Genesius († 662)
 Gyroindus (660)
 Felix
 Garivaldus
 Saint-Priest (also called Saint Prix) (666–676)
 Avitus II (676–691)
 Bonitus
 Nordebertus
 Proculus
 Stephanus (Étienne I) (761)
 Adebertus (785)
 Bernouin (about 811)
 Stabilis (823–860)
 Sigon (about 863)
 Egilmar of Clermont (875–891)
 Adalard (910)
 Arnold (about 912)
 Bernard I
 Étienne II of Clermont (about 945–976)
 Begon (about 980–1010)
 Étienne III of Clermont (about 1010–1014 / 1013)
 Étienne IV (1014–1025)
 Rencon (1030–1053)
 Étienne V of Polignac (about 1053–1073)
 Guillaume of Chamalières (Guillaume I) (1073–1076)
 Durand (1077–1095)
 Guillaume of Baffie (Guillaume II) (1096)
 Pierre Roux (Pierre I) (1105–1111)
 Aimeri (1111–1150)
 Étienne VI of Mercœur (1151–1169)

List of bishops of Clermont
 Ponce of Clairvaux (1170–1189)
 Gilbert I (1190–1195)
 Robert of Auvergne (1195–1227)
 Hughes of la Tour du Pin (1227–1249)
 Guy of la Tour du Pin (1250–1286)
 Aimar of Cros (1286–1297)
 Jean Aicelin (Jean I) (1298–1301)
 Pierre of Cros (Pierre II) (1302–1304)
 Aycelin of Montaigut (also called Aubert) (1307–1328)
 Arnaud Roger of Comminges (1328–1336)
 Raymond of Aspet (1336–1340)
 Étienne Aubert (Étienne VII) (was also Pope Innocent VI from 1352–1362) (1340–1342)
 Pierre André (Pierre III) (1342–1349)
 Pierre of Aigrefeuille (Pierre IV) (1349–1357)
 Jean de Mello (Jean II) (1357–1376)
 Henri of La Tour (1376–1415)
 Martin Gouge de Charpaignes (1415–1444)
 Jacques of Comborn (Jacques I) (1445–1474)
 Antoine Allemand (Antoine I) (1475–1476)
 Cardinal Charles II, Duke of Bourbon (Charles I) (1476–1488)
 Charles of Bourbon (Charles II) (1489–1504)
 Jacques of Amboise (Jacques II) (1505–1516)
 Thomas Duprat (1517–1528)
 Guillaume Duprat (Guillaume III) (1529–1560)
 Cardinal Bernard Saliviati (Bernard II) (1561–1567)
 Antoine of Saint-Nectaire (Antoine II) (1567–1584)
 Cardinal François de La Rochefoucauld (François I) (1585–1609)
 Antoine Rose (Antoine III) (1609–1614)
 Joachim of Estaing (1614–1650)
 Louis of Estaing (Louis I) (1650–1664)
 Gilbert of Veiny d'Arbouze (Gilbert II) (1664–1682)
 Michel of Castagnet (is appointed but does not get his bull and returns)
 Claude II of Saint-Georges (1684–1687)
 François Bochart of Saron (François II) (1687–1715)
 Louis of Balzac Illiers d'Entragues (Louis II) (1716–1717)
 Jean-Baptiste Massillon (1717–1742)
 François-Marie Le Maistre de La Garlaye (1743–1775)
 François of Bonnal (François III) (1776–1800)
 Jean-François Périer (constitutional bishop) (1791–1802)
 Charles-Antoine-Henri Du Valk de Dampierre (1802–1833)
 Louis-Charles Féron (1833–1879)
 Jean-Pierre Boyer (1879–1892)
 Pierre-Marie Belmont (1893–1921)
 Jean-François-Étienne Marnas (1921–1932)
 Gabriel-Emmanuel-Joseph Piguet (1933–1952)
 Pierre-Abel-Louis Chappot de la Chanonie (1953–1973)
 Jean Louis Joseph Dardel (1974–1995)

List of archbishops of Clermont-Ferrand
 Hippolyte Simon (1996–2016)
 Francois Kalist (2016–present)

Dauphins of Auvergne

What is by convenience called the Dauphinate of Auvergne was in reality the remnant of the County of Auvergne after the usurpation of Count William VII the Young around 1155 by his uncle Count William VIII the Old.

The young count was able to maintain his status in part of his county, especially Beaumont, Chamalières, and Montferrand. Some authors have therefore named William VII and his descendants counts of Clermont, although this risks confusion with the County of Clermont-en-Beauvaisis and the episcopal County of Clermont in Auvergne.

The majority of authors, however, anticipating the formalization of the dauphinate in 1302, choose to call William VII and his successors the dauphins of Auvergne. Still others, out of convenience, choose to call these successors the counts-dauphins of Auvergne.

The title of Dauphin of Auvergne was derived from William VII's mother, who was the daughter of the dauphin de Viennois, Guigues IV. This meant that William VII's male descendants were usually given Dauphin as a surname.

The numbering of the counts-turned-Dauphins is complicated. Some authors create a new numbering starting with the first dauphins even though the dauphinate did not really begin until 1302. Others choose to reestablish, beginning with William the Young, the numbering of the viscounts of Clermont who became counts of Auvergne, particularly for the dauphins named Robert.

The parallel existence of the usurpers of the County of Auvergne and of the counts-dauphins, who often carried the same first names, also complicates things. To avoid confusion, the numbering system used here is continuous, and Dauphin is used as part of the name where applicable.

List of dauphins of Auvergne
 William VII Dauphin (also called William IV) (1155–1169)
 Robert IV (1169–1235)
 William VIII Dauphin (1235–1240)
 Robert V Dauphin (also called Robert VI or Robert I) (1240–1262)
 Robert VI Dauphin (also called Robert VII or Robert II) (1262–1282)
 Robert VII Dauphin (also called Robert VIII or Robert III) (1282–1324)
 John, Dauphin of Auvergne (1324–1352), son of Robert VII
 Beraud I, Dauphin of Auvergne (1352–1356), son of John
 Beraud II, Dauphin of Auvergne (1356–1400), son of Beraud I
 Beraud III, Dauphin of Auvergne (1400–1426), son of Beraud II
 Anne of Auvergne (1400–1417), daughter of Beraud II
 John I, Duke of Bourbon (1417–1434), son of Anne
 Joanna, Dauphine of Auvergne (co-ruled with John I 1428–1434), daughter of Beraud III, married Louis I, Count of Montpensier
 Louis I, Count of Montpensier (1434–1486), son of John I and Marie, Duchess of Auvergne (see Dukes of Auvergne below); husband of Joanna
 Gilbert, Count of Montpensier (1486–1496), son of Louis I
 Louis II, Count of Montpensier (1496–1501), son of Gilbert
 Charles III, Duke of Bourbon (1501–1527), son of Gilbert

From 1525–1538 the dauphinate was confiscated by the king and united with the royal domain.

 Louise de Bourbon, Duchess of Montpensier (1527–1561), daughter of Gilbert
 Louis, Duke of Montpensier (1561–1583), son of Louise
 François, Duke of Montpensier (1583–1592), son of Louis
 Henri, Duke of Montpensier (1592–1608), son of François
 Marie de Bourbon, Duchess of Montpensier (1608–1627), daughter of Henri
 Anne Marie Louise d'Orléans, Duchess of Montpensier (1627–1693), daughter of Marie

At her death in 1693, the title returned to the royal domain. It was later given to:

 Elisabeth, Dauphine of Auvergne (1652–1722), great-great-granddaughter of the great-great-aunt of the predecessor, married Philip I, Duke of Orléans, Dauphin of Auvergne
 Philip II, Duke of Orléans, Dauphin of Auvergne, son of Elisabeth

Afterwards, the title returned to the royal domain and was claimed as a courtesy title by the dukes of Orléans, and the modern Orleanist pretenders.

Dukes of Auvergne

The Duchy of Auvergne was created in 1360 by John II of France, out of the former royal territory of Auvergne, confiscated by Philip II of France in 1209.

List of dukes of Auvergne
 John, Duke of Berry (1360–1416), first husband of Joan II, Countess of Auvergne
 Marie of Berry (1416–1425) daughter of John
 John I, Duke of Bourbon (1416–1425), husband of Marie
 Charles I, Duke of Bourbon (1425–1456), son of Marie and John I
 John II, Duke of Bourbon (1456–1488), son of Charles I
 Charles II, Duke of Bourbon (1488), son of Charles I
 Peter II, Duke of Bourbon (1488–1503), son of Charles I
 Suzanne, Duchess of Bourbon (1503–1521), daughter of Peter II
 Charles III, Duke of Bourbon (1505–1527), husband of Susanna

After his death in 1527, the title was confiscated and passed to the royal domain.

 Louise of Savoy (1467–1531), granddaughter of Charles I, Duke of Bourbon through her mother, Margaret of Bourbon

Louise confronted Charles III's right to succession with the support of her son, King Francis I of France. After her death in 1531, the title passed to the royal domain.

 Charles X of France (1757–1824)

External links
 Extensive historical background on Auvergne (fr)
 Original manuscript c1505 with pictures of Auvergne castles belonging to Anne de la tour Princesse d'Ecossse.